Nachiketa Ghosh (28 January 1925 – 12 October 1976) was a Bengali music director in India. He mainly composed for Bengali, Hindi, and Oriya songs.

Bengali filmography as music composer

References
Nachiketa Ghosh, Aajkal, 

Indian male composers
University of Calcutta alumni
1976 deaths
1925 births
20th-century Indian composers
Musicians from Kolkata
20th-century male musicians
Bengali musicians